Hooker is a surname, originally indicating someone who made hooks or an agricultural worker who used hooks. Notable people with the surname include:

Amani Hooker (born 1998), American football player
Brad Hooker (born 1957), English philosopher
Cameron Hooker, American man sentenced to prison for 105 years for the kidnapping of Colleen Stan
Charles E. Hooker (1825–1914), U.S. Representative from Mississippi
Dan Hooker, New Zealand mixed martial artist
Destinee Hooker (born 1987), American volleyball player
Earl Hooker (1929–1970), American blues guitarist
Elon Huntington Hooker (1869–1938), American entrepreneur
Evelyn Hooker (1907–1996), American psychologist
Fair Hooker (born 1947), American professional football player
Frank A. Hooker (1844–1911), American jurist
George Hooker (rugby league), Australian rugby league footballer
George Hooker (cricketer) (1836–1877), English cricketer
George W. Hooker (1838–1902), American military officer and politician
H. Lester Hooker (1921–1999), American college sports coach
Hendon Hooker (born 1998), American football player
Henrietta Hooker (1851–1929), American botanist
Henry Hooker (1828–1907), American Old West rancher
Isabella Beecher Hooker (1822–1907), American suffragette leader
Jake Hooker (journalist) (born 1973), American Pulitzer Prize-winning journalist
James Hooker (disambiguation)
Janusz Hooker (born 1969), Australian businessman
Jeff Hooker (born 1965), American retired soccer player and current coach
John Hooker (English constitutionalist) (c. 1527 – 1601), English writer, solicitor, antiquary, civic administrator and advocate of republican government
John Daggett Hooker (1838–1911), social leader, amateur scientist and astronomer, donor of Hooker Telescope
John Lee Hooker (1917–2001), American blues musician
Johnny Hooker (born 1987), Brazilian rock/MPB musician
Joseph Hooker (1814–1879), American Civil War major general
Joseph Dalton Hooker (1817–1911), English botanist, son of William Jackson Hooker
Katharine Putnam Hooker (1849–1935), American writer, philanthropist and socialite
Leslie Joseph Hooker (1903–1976), Australian property entrepreneur, businessman and philanthropist
Malik Hooker (born 1996), American football player
Marjorie Hooker (1908–1976), American geologist
Morna Hooker (born 1931), British theologian and New Testament scholar
Olivia Hooker (1915–2018), United States Coast Guard officer and psychologist
Philip Hooker (1766–1836), American architect
Quinton Hooker (born 1995), American basketball player in the Israeli Basketball Premier League
Reginald Hawthorn Hooker (1867–1944), English statistician, son of Joseph Dalton Hooker
Richard Hooker (1554–1600), Anglican theologian
Richard Hooker (author), pseudonym of H. Richard Hornberger (1924–1997), American writer and surgeon
Robbie Hooker (born 1967), Australian footballer and football manager
Ron Hooker (born 1935), English former cricketer
S. Percy Hooker (1860–1915), American politician from New York and New Hampshire 
Stanley Hooker (1907–1984), English aviation engineer
Steve Hooker (born 1982), Australian pole vaulter
Thomas Hooker (1586–1647), Puritan leader
T J Hooker fictional character portrayed by William Shatner
William Hooker (musician) (born 1946), American jazz drummer and composer
William Hooker (botanical illustrator) (1779–1832), known for Hooker's Green
William Jackson Hooker (1785–1865), English botanist, father of Joseph Dalton Hooker
Worthington Hooker (1806–1867), American physician
Hooker (Kent cricketer), 18th century English cricketer

English-language surnames
Occupational surnames
Surnames of English origin
English-language occupational surnames